Triplicity is an album by pianist Mickey Tucker which was recorded in 1975 and released on the Xanadu label.

Reception

The Allmusic review awarded the album 3 stars. Down Beat stated "Tucker's dazzling harmonic sensibility is impressively united with an idiomatic eclecticism embracing everything from ragtime to Cecil Taylorish flurries".

Track listing 
All compositions by Mickey Tucker except as indicated
 "Happy" - 4:54  
 "Blues for Khalid Yasin" - 4:48  
 "Malapaga" - 8:34  
 "Strange Blues" - 5:32  
 "Giant Steps" (John Coltrane) - 5:36  
 "Suite for Eddie: The Man from Gladden" - 5:48  
 "Suite for Eddie: Something for a Quiet Man" - 7:35  
 "Suite for Eddie: Boyd Street Bop" - 4:17

Personnel 
Mickey Tucker - piano, organ
Jimmy Ponder - guitar (tracks 5-8)
Gene Perla - bass
Eddie Gladden - drums

References 

Mickey Tucker albums
1976 albums
Xanadu Records albums
Albums produced by Don Schlitten